Salah Chammah (born 17 July 1937) is a Lebanese weightlifter. He competed in the men's featherweight event at the 1960 Summer Olympics.

References

1937 births
Living people
Lebanese male weightlifters
Olympic weightlifters of Lebanon
Weightlifters at the 1960 Summer Olympics
Sportspeople from Beirut
20th-century Lebanese people